Moonbug Entertainment  (also known as just Moonbug, stylised as all-lowercase moonbug) is a British children's media company and multi-channel network headquartered in London, with an overseas office in Los Angeles, United States which creates, produces, and distributes children's video and audio content. It is currently owned by Candle Media, an American media company led by Kevin Mayer and Tom Staggs. Moonbug distributes children's entertainment intellectual property, including the YouTube channels Cocomelon and Little Baby Bum and YouTube series such as Mia's Magic Playground, Blippi, and My Magic Pet Morphle.

Since being founded in 2018, the company has distributed many series and franchises across animation, live-action and puppet shows. Moonbug shows can also be found on many streaming services. Moonbug programming is distributed on more than 100 platforms and is available in 26 languages around the world.

History
Moonbug Entertainment was co-founded in 2018 by René Rechtman, the former president of international at Maker Studios (now Rogue Rocket and formerly known as Disney Digital Network), and John Robson, the former managing director of WildBrain (now WildBrain Spark). The company was incorporated on 9 February 2018, under the name Project ABC Holdings Limited.

In December 2020, Moonbug appointed former vice president of children's programming for Disney Channels in Europe and Africa/UK & Ireland, David Levine, to head the studio. On 19 October 2021, a company backed by The Blackstone Group is said to be interested in buying Moonbug. Later, on 5 November 2021, Moonbug acquired by an unnamed company led by Kevin Mayer and Tom Staggs which also backed by Blackstone. Later, in January 2022, it is revealed that the current holding company of Moonbug was named Candle Media.

In 1 March 2023, Moonbug rebranded their logo.

Acquisitions
In September 2018, YouTube channel Little Baby Bum was acquired by Moonbug for an estimated US$9 million. My Magic Pet Morphle (formerly by Morphle TV) was acquired on 11 February 2019, while Supa Strikas on 6 August 2019. On 31 July 2020, Cocomelon and Blippi were purchased together for US$120 million.

In February 2020, South Korean animated series Arpo: The Robot for All Kids created by Toonzip, which first aired on 2012 by MBC TV, was bought by Moonbug. As of 2021 Canary Islands-based studio 3Doubles Producciones produces the show for Moonbug on YouTube. The ownership of Arpo, however, is not really clear since another South Korean animation studio Anyzac (which owns Zombiedumb), founded by former Toonzip executives in 2013, also claimed that series.

On 10 February 2022, Moonbug acquired the YouTube network Little Angel. On 24 May 2022, Moonbug acquired Singapore-based media company One Animation, producer of Oddbods.

Partnerships with Moonbug
On 13 October 2019, Moonbug signed a content deal with Nordic Entertainment Group to create an animated series entitled Mia's Magic Playground. On 24 August 2020, Moonbug announced a partnership with HBO Max to release Moonbug's original series Mia's Magic Playground, which consists of 24 episodes. On the same day, Moonbug also announced another partnership with MGA Entertainment to create an animated series based on the Cozy Coupe toy line, titled Let's Go Cozy Coupe.

In April 2020, Moonbug partnered with Chinese video platform Xigua Video to bring Little Baby Bum to a Chinese audience. Later that year, in September, the company signed another distribution deal with Tencent Video, a streaming platform owned by the Chinese internet company Tencent, to host four of Moonbug's programs: Go Buster, Playtime with Twinkle, KiiYii, and The Sharksons.

On 18 August 2020, it was confirmed that Moonbug had signed a deal with Cloudco Entertainment to operate the Care Bears YouTube channel and to co-produce a web series based on the franchise, titled Care Bears: Unlock the Music. This deal expired in 2022, and Cloudco reverted to operating the channel with their previous management partner Little Dot Studios later on in the year.

On 21 August 2020, Moonbug launched a Little Baby Bum FAST channel on Pluto TV.

On 23 September 2020, Moonbug announced an agreement with Virgin Media to distribute its shows. On 7 January 2021, Moonbug Entertainment and licensing company The Point. 1888 secured six companies for Blippi-branded merchandise. On 3 February 2021, Moonbug Entertainment partnered with children's TV channel Spacetoon to distribute its shows via Spacetoon Go.

A partnership with global talent and entertainment company United Talent Agency was formed in September 2020 to expand domestic publishing and video game rights of kids' products in North America.

In January 2021 "Future Today," a publishing platform, expanded its partnership with Moonbug when it launched five omni-platform streaming channels to host Moonbug's most-watched children's series, including Blippi, Cocomelon, Little Baby Bum, My Magic Pet Morphle and Supa Strikas. Moonbug also partnered with Jazwares, Creative Kids, Texco, Round Room and DJ Murphy to create Blippi branded products.

Also in January 2021, Moonbug also launched a partnership with Poetic Brands to create branded children's clothing based on Moonbug's program Blippi. Other licenses acquired by The Point.1888 for Blippi are: Scholastic Publishers, as a master publisher; Misirli, an underwear company, to manufacture Blippi branded socks; TDP Textiles and Aykroyds & Sons, manufacturers of swimwear and nightwear, to make Blippi bathing suits and pajamas; RMS International, to create puzzles; and Zak to make branded lunch boxes. Wow! Stuff launched a partnership with Moonbug to create electronic toys based on the Cocomelon brand. Later that month, the company appointed Redibra, a brand licensing company, to be the licensing agent for its properties in Brazil.

On 8 April 2021, Moonbug announced partnership with Israeli company Noga Communications to launch the Moonbug Kids channel on their on-demand platform BIGI. In June 2021, Moonbug partners with Jazwares to release YouTube animated series Squishville which is based on the Squishmallows toy franchise. On 13 July 2021, the toy producer WowWee announced partnership with Moonbug to release Arpo: The Robot for All Kids-branded toys. On 19 August 2021, Universal Music Group (UMG) declared global partnership with Moonbug Entertainment to bring the Moonbug's library.

On 28 October 2021, Moonbug secured a partnership with the costume manufacturing company Rubies, and the costumes will available as of 2022 across EMEA. In October 2022, Fairmont Hotel at Jakarta, Indonesia launched tens of Cocomelon-themed rooms with Moonbug partnership.

Divisions

Moonbug Kids

Moonbug Kids is a multi-channel network owned by Moonbug Entertainment. Moonbug Kids channels can be found on YouTube, Netflix, Hulu, Roku, Amazon Prime Video, Sky UK, Joyn (Germany), Mediaset (Italy), Cignal (Philippines), Astro (Malaysia), and OSN (Middle East). On YouTube, this consists of 22 main channels branded as Moonbug Kids (e.g. Moonbug Kids – After School Club – Kids Cartoons), while 12 other channels are in other languages. Moonbug also owns a YouTube channel named MyGo! of which aims on the Moonbug library in sign language.

El Bebe Productions
El Bebe Productions is a Moonbug subsidiary founded in August 2011 which owns the Little Baby Bum YouTube channel.

List of shows
Many of Moonbug's shows were aired on YouTube and other streaming media services. However, Moonbug's version of Arpo: The Robot for All Kids was also aired on the Pakistani-based children's interest channel Champion TV, and Cocomelon was also aired by Cartoonito in UK since April 2021, and Super RTL in Germany.

Moonbug also showcases several shows on channels they operate, such as BoBoiBoy Galaxy, Care Bears: Unlock the Magic, Care Bears & Cousins, Thomas & Friends, Mr. Bean: The Animated Series and Real Wheels.

Original shows
Blippi Wonders (29 September 2021–)
Digley & Dazey (7 March 2020–)
Go Buster
Mia's Magic Playground (12 November 2020–)
Playtime with Twinkle
The Ring-A-Tangs
The Sharksons

Distributed shows
Arpo: The Robot for All Kids (2 April–2 July 2012, 2019–)
Blippi (18 February 2014–)
Gecko's Garage (25 September 2015–)
Glove and Boots (2018–2019; acquired from Bento Box Entertainment)
KiiYii
My Magic Pet Morphle (26 March 2015–)
Supa Strikas (2010–)
T-Rex Ranch
Real Wheels
Oddbods
BoBoiBoy

Shows based on licensed properties
Care Bears: Unlock the Music (1 July 2020–)
Let's Go Cozy Coupe (24 August 2020–)
Squishville (26 June 2021–)

YouTube channels
Cocomelon
Little Angel
Little Baby Bum
Blippi

Controversy
On mid-March 2022, The Ivors Academy and Musicians' Union in the UK criticised the "letters of direction" used by Moonbug to get composers to assign the company their performing rights royalties.

Notes

References

External links
Official website

2018 establishments in England
British animation studios
Mass media companies established in 2018
British companies established in 2018
Mass media companies based in London
Entertainment companies established in 2018
Moonbug Entertainment
2021 mergers and acquisitions
British subsidiaries of foreign companies